Phill Brown (born 1950) is an audio engineer who has worked with a number of well-known musicians, including: Traffic, Led Zeppelin, David Bowie, Cat Stevens, Bob Marley and Talk Talk. He is also the younger brother of Terry Brown.

Career
Brown began his career at Olympic Studios in London. He worked as the studio's tape-operator on Jimi Hendrix's All Along The Watchtower and Beggars Banquet by The Rolling Stones. Later, Brown worked on Bob Marley's I Shot the Sheriff.

See also
Are We Still Rolling?, published in 2011, covers Brown's involvement throughout 40 years of the British music industry.

References

External links
 Official web site

1955 births
Living people
People from Tottenham
British audio engineers